The Dodge-Bailey House, at 3775 Old Santa Fe Trail in Santa Fe, New Mexico, was built in 1940.  It was listed on the National Register of Historic Places in 2007.

It was a work of architect John Gaw Meem in Pueblo Revival style.

It is in the lower part of Sun Mountain.

References

National Register of Historic Places in Santa Fe County, New Mexico
Traditional Native American dwellings
Buildings and structures completed in 1940
Pueblo Revival architecture in Santa Fe, New Mexico
Native American history of New Mexico